Clemente Ruta (9 May 1668 – 11 November 1767) was an Italian painter of the late-Baroque period.

Biography
Born at Parma, he first trained with a painter by the name of Ilario Spolverini, 
 then later in Bologna with  Carlo Cignani.  He moved with the latter to Naples to work in the court of Charles of Bourbon. Ruta became blind in older life. He specialized in landscapes with pen and watercolour.

References

1668 births
1767 deaths
17th-century Italian painters
Italian male painters
18th-century Italian painters
Italian Baroque painters
Painters from Parma
18th-century Italian male artists